Donald Ray "Red" Cross (January 26, 1925 – November 29, 2003) was an American football player and coach. He served as the head football coach at Southwest Missouri State University—now known as Missouri State University—in Springfield, Missouri from 1969 to 1975, compiling a record of 23–45–3.

Head coaching record

College

References

External links
 

1925 births
2003 deaths
Illinois State Redbirds football coaches
Missouri State Bears football coaches
Southern Illinois Salukis football coaches
Southern Illinois Salukis football players
Western Illinois Leathernecks football coaches
High school football coaches in Missouri
High school football coaches in Illinois
People from Franklin County, Illinois
Players of American football from Illinois